Bonifacio De Bortoli (1922 – before 2009) was an Italian rower. He competed at the 1948 Summer Olympics in London with the men's eight where they were eliminated in the semi-final.

References

External links

1922 births
Year of death missing
Italian male rowers
Olympic rowers of Italy
Rowers at the 1948 Summer Olympics
Sportspeople from Varese
European Rowing Championships medalists